Mirror Mirror: A History of the Human Love Affair With Reflection is a 2003 nonfiction book written by American investigative journalist Mark Pendergrast. It was widely reviewed.

 (404 pages)

Synopsis
Pendergrast attempts to cover the history of mirrors and other reflective, refractive, or transparent materials and objects.  He begins in antiquity, citing references as old as 6200 to 4500 BCE.  He continues the thread to today, including space investigations, X-rays and kaleidoscopes.

References

2003 non-fiction books
American non-fiction books
Mirrors